Write once, run anywhere (WORA), or sometimes Write once, run everywhere (WORE), was a 1995 slogan created by Sun Microsystems to illustrate the cross-platform benefits of the Java language. Ideally, this meant that a Java program could be developed on any device, compiled into standard bytecode, and be expected to run on any device equipped with a Java virtual machine (JVM). The installation of a JVM or Java interpreter on chips, devices, or software packages became an industry standard practice.

A programmer could develop code on a PC and expect it to run on Java-enabled mobile phones, as well as on routers and mainframes equipped with Java, without any adjustments. This was intended to save software developers the effort of writing a different version of their software for each platform or operating system they intend to deploy on.

This idea originated no later than the 1960s, with  the IBM M44/44X, and in the late 1970s the UCSD Pascal system was developed to produce and interpret p-code. UCSD Pascal (along with the Smalltalk virtual machine) was a key influence on the design of the JVM, as is cited by James Gosling.

The catch is that since there are multiple JVM implementations, on top of a wide variety of different operating systems, there could be subtle differences in how a program executes on each JVM/OS combination, possibly requiring an application to be tested on each target platform. This gave rise to a joke among Java developers: Write Once, Debug Everywhere.

In comparison, the Squeak Smalltalk programming language and environment boasts of being truly write once run anywhere, because it runs bit-identical images across its wide portability base.

Like Squeak, MicroEJ provides a virtual execution environment that guarantees one unique Java thread policy across all implementations, ensuring a true WORA semantic across millions of devices.

See also
Criticisms of cross-platform development and this slogan
Software portability
Write once, compile anywhere
Free Pascal
Parrot virtual machine
Criticism of Java
Write once, run forever
Universal Windows Platform

References

Software engineering folklore
American advertising slogans
Sun Microsystems
Computer programming folklore
Computing acronyms
1995 neologisms
Interoperability